WDYR-CD, virtual channel 33 (UHF digital channel 18), was a low-power, Class A television station licensed to Dyersburg, Tennessee, United States. The station was owned by Marion, Illinois–based Tri-State Christian Television. WDYR-CD's studios were located on Upper Finley Road in Dyersburg.

History 
WDYR's application history began in 1995 under the callsign W33BO. The late Ray Ashley, Jr., senior law partner of law firm Ashley, Ashley & Arnold in Dyersburg and former Tennessee State Attorney General (1974–76) filed for the original application. Former Memphis TV news reporter Tommy Stafford, a friend of Ashley's, co-founded the station. By 1999, the station was on air and had launched a local news operation, titled Tri 33 News. The news aired at 6:30 a.m., 6 p.m. and 10 p.m. CT, including anchors that had left nearby television stations in Jackson, Memphis, and Paducah to start the newscast. The original anchors of the 6 p.m. newscast were Larry McIntosh (who formerly anchored in the Paducah market), Tiffany Carey, a former Jackson anchor, and the producer and weather anchor Carey Byars, who had previously reported nationally for the syndicated series AgDay. After a contentious meeting, original founders Ashley and Stafford found themselves at odds with shareholders in the company.

Outside shareholders had been brought in to give the station sufficient capitalization. However, some of these outside shareholders and the founders disagreed strongly on the direction the station should be headed. Ashley and Stafford didn't feel their original vision was being followed. They left the board and eventually the company in early 2000. The news was gone by the summer of 2000, when the Tri-State Christian Television network acquired the station and began airing its network's programming, which was a mixture of Christian programming.

TCT surrendered their license to this outlet in February 2013. The station is now defunct.

Before the station left the air, WDYR-CD carried all TCT network programming, along with some syndicated shows such as Bridging the Gap, Jack Van Impe Presents, A Bible Answer (originating from an area church in Paducah), Manna Fest, and a few others.

Coverage area 
In addition to its Dyer County coverage, WDYR was also available to antenna users in surrounding areas like parts of Crockett, Lake and Obion Counties of Tennessee, as well as into the Caruthersville, Missouri area. In Pemiscot County, Missouri, including the Steele area and Mississippi County, Arkansas, including the Osceola area, the station was available on cable television via NewWave Communications.

References

External links
Tri-State Christian Television

DYR-CD
Television channels and stations established in 1995
1995 establishments in Tennessee
Television channels and stations disestablished in 2011
2011 disestablishments in Tennessee
Defunct television stations in the United States
Dyer County, Tennessee
DYR-CD